Omorgus dohrni is a species of hide beetle in the subfamily Omorginae.

References

dohrni
Beetles described in 1871